Carl Ford "Spider" Lockhart (April 6, 1943 – July 9, 1986) was an American football defensive back in the National Football League for the New York Giants. He was a two-time Pro Bowler.  Lockhart played college football at North Texas State University and was drafted in the thirteenth round of the 1965 NFL Draft.

On arriving at Giants training camp, Emlen Tunnell, their defensive backfield coach, gave Carl the nickname Spider. The popular and talented Spider spent his entire 11-year career with the Giants.  He was a Pro Bowl free safety in 1966, despite the Giants being the worst defensive team in points allowed/game in NFL history: 35.8 (14 games, see 1966 New York Giants season), the 1981 Baltimore Colts allowing 533 points in 16 games: 33.3; see List of National Football League records (team). In particular, their run defense was shredded by Washington Redskins runners with 209 yards, net passing yards only 132, in a 72–41 game, the most points allowed by both teams combined in a single game, Lockhart did get an interception against Sonny Jurgensen in the game.

He was a Pro Bowl free safety a second time in 1968, leading the league in defensive touchdowns.  Spider intercepted 41 passes in his career and recovered 16 fumbles during his 145 games played, leading the league in fumble recoveries in 1967. Lockhart also gained 328 yards returning punts and was famous for rarely calling for a fair catch.

Spider retired from football in 1975 at the age of 32 and was a resident of Teaneck, New Jersey. On July 9, 1986, at the age of 43,  Spider died of lymphoma.  In his honor, a "Spider patch" was worn by the Giants throughout their Super Bowl XXI-winning 1986 season.

In 1993, his widow won a $15.7 million malpractice verdict, after claiming that doctors at St. Vincent's Hospital had misdiagnosed swollen lymph nodes when he went to the hospital in 1979 and told a doctor there that he feared that he had cancer. Then living in Mahwah, New Jersey, Lockhart was not correctly diagnosed until he returned to see a doctor two years after his initial complaint.

References

External links
 Football Database

1943 births
1986 deaths
Players of American football from Dallas
American football defensive backs
North Texas Mean Green football players
New York Giants players
Eastern Conference Pro Bowl players
Deaths from lymphoma
People from Mahwah, New Jersey
People from Teaneck, New Jersey
Deaths from cancer in New Jersey